Khan-e Guran (also Romanized as Khān-e Gūrān; also known as Khāneh-ye Gūrān and Khūn-e Gūrān) is a village in Ahmadi Rural District, Ahmadi District, Hajjiabad County, Hormozgan Province, Iran. At the 2006 census, its population was 40, in 9 families.

References 

Populated places in Hajjiabad County